Delochilocoris is a genus of dirt-colored seed bugs in the family Rhyparochromidae. There are at least three described species in Delochilocoris.

Species
These three species belong to the genus Delochilocoris:
 Delochilocoris caliginosus (Distant, 1893)
 Delochilocoris gracilis Scudder, 2008
 Delochilocoris illuminatus (Distant, 1893)

References

External links

 

Rhyparochromidae
Articles created by Qbugbot